(September 10, 1709 – July 26, 1735) was a Japanese daimyō of the Edo period, who ruled the Tokushima Domain. His court title was Awa no kami.

Family
 Father: Hachisuka Tsunanori
 Mother: Kahime
 Concubines:
 Okada-dono
 Unknown
 Children:
 Hachisuka Shigenori (1729-1751) by Okada-dono
 Tsunechiyo by Unknown
 daughter betrothed to Ii Naoyoshi by Unknown

Reference

|-

1709 births
1735 deaths
Daimyo
Hachisuka clan